is the ninth studio album by Japanese entertainer Miho Nakayama. Released through King Records on September 5, 1989, the album features the single "Virgin Eyes", as well as a re-recording of her 1988 No. 1 hit "You're My Only Shinin' Star". It was also Nakayama's last album to be issued on LP.

The album was Nakayama's third to hit No. 1 on Oricon's albums chart. It also sold over 190,000 copies and was certified Gold by the RIAJ.

Track listing

Charts

Certification

References

External links
 
 
 

1989 albums
Miho Nakayama albums
Japanese-language albums
King Records (Japan) albums